Beata Predehl (born 10 April 1971) is a Polish former basketball player who competed in the 2000 Summer Olympics.

References

1971 births
Living people
Polish women's basketball players
Olympic basketball players of Poland
Basketball players at the 2000 Summer Olympics
People from Pabianice
Sportspeople from Łódź Voivodeship